Erotic sensation play is a class of activities meant to impart physical sensations upon a partner, as opposed to mental forms of erotic play such as power exchange or sexual roleplaying.

Sensation play can be sensual, where the sensations are generally pleasing and light. Many couples that would not consider themselves active in BDSM are familiar with this kind of play: the use of silk scarves, feathers, ice, massage oils, and other similar implements.

Sensation play in BDSM can also involve sadomasochistic play, involving the application of carefully controlled stimuli to the human body so that it reacts as if it were actually hurt. While this can involve the infliction of actual pain, it is usually done in order to release pleasurable endorphins, creating a sensation somewhat like runner's high or the afterglow of orgasm.

Examples 
In BDSM play, the top (or dominant) introduces and controls the sensation to the bottom (or submissive).

 Two partners exploring the sensations of kissing or other intimacy while blindfolded
 Unusual textures such as feathers, silk, or leather
 Erotic tickling
 Sensory deprivation such as mummification
 Contact with intense temperatures, such as ice or hot wax
 Biting and clawing
 Whips, flogging, bondage suspension and other BDSM related activities.
 Clamping parts of the body with clothespins, forceps, nipple clamps or similar devices.
 Other implements that may not be normally be used in a sexual context, such as an electric toothbrush.  These items may be referred to as pervertibles within the BDSM community.

The sensation can come from just about anywhere, provided that the implement and its use fall within the negotiated terms of the interaction or relationship.  Sensation play is limited only by one's own imagination and a lot of variation can occur from one play scene to the next.  For example, chains could be left in a freezer for some time and then laid across the body of a bottom or submissive.  Or the chain could just be brought out of a bag and run across the body or perhaps just rattled loudly to invoke a response.

Safety 
Note that safety and consent are of paramount importance in the practice of more intense forms of sensation play. People engaging in such activities should adhere to the principles of "safe, sane and consensual" or of "risk-aware consensual kink".

See also
 Glossary of BDSM
 Impact play
 Pain play

References

BDSM terminology